Redfern is an inner southern suburb of Sydney located 3 kilometres south of the Sydney central business district and is part of the local government area of the City of Sydney. Strawberry Hills is a locality on the border with Surry Hills. The area experienced the process of gentrification and is subject to extensive redevelopment plans by the state government, to increase the population and reduce the concentration of poverty in the suburb and neighbouring Waterloo (see Redfern-Eveleigh-Darlington).

History

The suburb is named after surgeon William Redfern, who was granted  of land in this area in 1817 by Lachlan Macquarie. He built a country house on his property surrounded by flower and kitchen gardens. His neighbours were Captain Cleveland, an officer of the 73rd regiment, who built Cleveland House and John Baptist, who ran a nursery and seed business. Sydney's original railway terminus was built in Cleveland Paddocks and extended from Cleveland Street to Devonshire Street and west to Chippendale. The station's name was chosen to honour William Redfern. At that time, the present Redfern station was known as Eveleigh. When Central station was built further north on the site of the Devonshire Street cemetery, Eveleigh station became Redfern and Eveleigh was retained for the name of the railway workshops, south of the station. The remains of Cleveland Paddocks became Prince Alfred Park.

In August 1859, Redfern was incorporated as a borough. The Municipality of Redfern merged with the City of Sydney from 1 January 1949.

On 17 January 1908 at Redfern Town Hall the South Sydney Rugby League Football Club was formed to compete in the first season of the New South Wales Rugby Football League Premiership.

In the 1960s and 70s, Liquidambar styraciflua trees were planted in Baptist Street in attempts to green and improve the physical environment. The notorious Redfern Mail Exchange was built in 1965, after 300 people were evicted from their homes on the  site. It became the scene of many industrial disputes when the automatic mail-sorting machinery, which was supposed to sort mail more efficiently, destroyed many letters and became known as the Redfern Mangler.

In the late 1960s and 1970s, a black power movement, centred around Aboriginal Australian migrants to the city, formed and resulted in the creation of health clinics, food drives, housing co-operatives and a legal aid centre. A green ban helped save the Redfern Aboriginal Centre in the 1970s and activists from Redfern created the Aboriginal Tent Embassy in Canberra.

The 2004 Redfern riots began on 14 February 2004, at the end of Eveleigh Street outside Redfern station, sparked by the death of Thomas 'TJ' Hickey. The teenager, riding on his bicycle, was allegedly being chased by a police vehicle, which led to his impalement on a fence. Members of his family were then reported to have started grieving for TJ around Eveleigh Street with a crowd gathering commiserating with the family. Fliers were distributed blaming police for TJ's death. The police closed the Eveleigh Street entrance to the railway station, but youths in the crowd became violent, throwing bricks and bottles; this escalated into a riot. A subsequent inquest found that although the police were following Hickey, they had not caused the accident, a verdict that caused controversy in Redfern's Indigenous community. The riots sparked fresh debate into the welfare of Indigenous Australians and the response of the police to those living in the Redfern area.

Buildings

Commercial area
The main shopping strip is located on Redfern Street, east of Redfern railway station. There are also commercial developments nearby, along Regent Street and surrounding streets. The Redfern skyline is dominated by two office towers and two residential blocks located between Regent Street and Gibbons Street, beside Redfern railway station.

Transport

Redfern railway station, located on the western edge of the suburb is a major station on the Sydney Trains network. Redfern is the first station south from Central Sydney terminus on the edge of the city. Redfern station is the closest station to the main campus of the University of Sydney at Camperdown and Darlington. A near-constant stream of commuters flows from the station along the south side of Lawson Street towards the university in the morning, and back towards the station in a largely hourly rhythm in the afternoon.

Housing

Redfern has many fine examples of Victorian terraced housing similar to other inner suburbs, such as Surry Hills and Paddington. Also, like some other inner-city suburbs, some parts of Redfern have been gentrified, whilst still retaining a large public housing estate shared with Waterloo, consisting of flats, terrace houses and high rise apartment blocks, developing a similar reputation to the former block on the other side of the suburb.

Churches and schools
St Vincent de Paul Catholic Church is on Redfern Street. St Saviour's Anglican Church (which is also known as one1seven church) is on Young Street. St George Antioch Orthodox Church is on the corner of Walker Street and Cooper Street built by the historic Lebanese community in the area. The Greek Orthodox Church in Cleveland Street is called the Cathedral of the Annunciation of Our Lady, formerly St Paul's Church of England built in 1848 and designed by Edmund Blacket. The St Andrew's Greek Orthodox Theological College sits beside it. Hillsong Church's city campus is at 188 Young Street. There is also another cathedral, the St Maroun’s Cathedral for the Lebanese community.

Heritage buildings

Redfern has a number of heritage-listed sites, including:
242 Cleveland Street: Cathedral of the Annunciation of Our Lady
 Elizabeth, Redfern, Chalmers, and Phillip Streets: Redfern Oval
 18 George Street: Redfern Aboriginal Children's Services
 Main Suburban railway line: Eveleigh Chief Mechanical Engineer's office, Railway Workshops and machinery
 Main Suburban railway line: Redfern railway station
 6-18 Pitt Street: Fitzroy Terrace, Redfern
 113 Redfern Street: Redfern Post Office

Other notable buildings
The Aboriginal Dance Theatre Redfern is at 82–88 Renwick Street.

Demographics

At the 2021 census, there were 13,072 people living in Redfern.

The most common countries of birth were England 5.1%, China 4.7%, New Zealand 3.3%, United States of America 1.6% and Ireland 1.1%. 61.7% of the population only spoke English at home, with the most important other languages being Mandarin (4.1%), Cantonese (2.5%), Spanish (2.3%), Russian (2.0%) and Greek (2.1%). 45.5% of the population marked no religion, higher than the national average. Of the remainder, 16.0% were Catholic, 6.1% Anglican and 3.6% Buddhist.

Redfern has broad sococioenomic characteristics. This may be partly due to the geography of the suburb, which is long, narrow and centrally located. Redfern has become increasingly gentrified, with many medium and high density developments replacing low density and industrial developments.

Redfern has been characterised by successive migrant populations.  In the late 19th century, local businessmen George Dan in 1890, Stanton and Aziz Melick in 1888 and Shafiqah Shasha and Anthony and Simon Coorey in the 1890s were from Lebanon.

Community

'The Block' is an area in the immediate vicinity of Redfern station bounded by Eveleigh, Caroline, Louis and Vine Streets. The Aboriginal Housing Company (AHC) was set up as the first urban Aboriginal community housing provider, using grant money to purchase the houses on the Block. As a result, the area is important to the Aboriginal community. Eveleigh Street, which is part of 'The Block', is well known for its community. In 2004 much of the Eveleigh Street housing was demolished with plans for redevelopment, but it is still an area around which many people congregate. The AHC's plans for redevelopment are known as the Pemulwuuy Project. The plans were approved in 2009.

Artwork on the outside of the local police boys club (PCYC) was made in the early 1990s. The front wall has a mural of a picture taken at Cleveland Street High School of a day when Dwayne "the D Train" McClain former Sydney Kings player visited the school. The picture has local sports stars such as Richard Bell, Bruce Swanson, Rossie Symmans, Nicholas Murray, Nathan Denzil, Jamie Sharpe, Lisa Mundine and Margaret Sutherland. The mural was painted by probably the most notable artist of the 90's in the Redfern district, Sir Joseph Phillips.

Sport and recreation 
A number of sporting teams represent the local area. The South Sydney Rabbitohs NRL club was formed at the Redfern Town Hall on 17 January 1908. One of the oldest Aboriginal rugby league teams in Australia, the Redfern All Blacks, play at Redfern Oval. The Redfern Raiders Soccer Club is a local Junior Soccer Club. Redfern Gym opened in 1985 and many boxing world champions have trained there.

Nikita Ridgeway established Australia's first indigenous hip-hop record label with her brother Stephen. Called Redfern Records, the label was named after the Sydney neighbourhood of Redfern they grew up in. A wall with a mural dedicated to one of the first Women in Rugby League was painted to honor Maggie Moloney, in 2022.

In popular culture
The 2011 Australian drama series Underbelly: Razor and 2012 Australian drama series Redfern Now were filmed on location in Redfern.

Notable people
 

Sydney Sim (1920–1990), second World War signalman

See also
 Aboriginal Dance Theatre Redfern
 Aboriginal Legal Service (NSW/ACT)
 Redfern Oval
 Redfern Town Hall
 Redfern Legal Centre
 Redfern All Blacks
 Redfern Now
 Story Factory
 Tribal Warrior

References

Further reading
 Anne-Marie Whitaker. Pictorial History of South Sydney. Published by Kingsclear Books, Australia. 2002.

External links

Redfern Oral History
City of Sydney - Our villages - Redfern Street
Redfern-Waterloo Authority
 Local Residents Group
 Local Community Centre
 Redfern Life Project
  [CC-By-SA]

 
Suburbs of Sydney
Green bans